Brown Bros. & Co. was an investment bank from 1818 until its merger with Harriman Brothers & Company in 1931, to form Brown Brothers Harriman & Co.  According to Zachary Karabell: In its first hundred years, the firm helped to make paper currency standard in the U.S., underwrote the earliest railroad and trans-Atlantic steamship companies and almost unilaterally created the first foreign exchange system between the American dollar and the British pound. In the 20th century, it became a cornerstone of what came to be known as “the Establishment,” as its partners entered the halls of government to shape the global economic and security system that remains the world’s institutional architecture.

History
Brown Brothers, an investment bank and trading company, was founded in 1818 in Philadelphia, Pennsylvania, by George Brown and John Brown, sons of former Ulster linen trader Alexander Brown (1764–1834) who had established a firm in Baltimore, Maryland. In 1825, the third son, James Brown (1791–1877), opened an affiliate in New York City under the name Brown Brothers and another in Boston, Massachusetts, in 1845. These firms were later merged under the name. James Brown's son, John Crosby Brown (1838–1909), would be a driving force for growth, making Wall Street in New York the center for operations and seeing the bank become major lenders to the textile, commodities, and transportation industries.

In 1931, the firm merged with Harriman Brothers & Company, another Wall Street firm owned by W. Averell Harriman and E. Roland Harriman, to form Brown Brothers Harriman & Co.

In 1964, John A. Kouwenhoven, professor of English at Barnard College and the author of The Columbia Historical Portrait of New York, among other works, was hired by Brown Brothers Harriman to identify and amass records of historical value to the firm. His title was Director of the Historical Files, which were to serve, among other purposes, as the research materials for the writing of Partners in Banking, commissioned by the publishers Doubleday & Co. to celebrate the firm's 150th anniversary in 1968. These files are held at the New-York Historical Society. The business records of Brown Brothers & Co. in New York City, including 176 volumes dated 1826–1880, were deposited at The New York Public Library and are almost entirely from the business career of James Brown.

See also

 Alex. Brown & Sons
 Brown Brothers Harriman & Co.
 Brown, Shipley & Co.

References

Further reading
 Brown, John Crosby. A Hundred Years of Merchant Banking, A History of Brown Brothers and Company. New York  (1909) online
 Karabell, Zachary. "The Capitalist Culture That Built America: Since the early 19th century, the firm of Brown Brothers defined the distinctive American mix of financial power and public service. Its example can still instruct us." Wall Street Journal May 14, 2021
 Killick, John R. "The Cotton Operations of Alexander Brown and Sons in the Deep South, 1820–1860." Journal of Southern History 43.2 (1977): 169–194. online
 Kouwenhoven, John Atlee. Partners in Banking: An Historical Portrait of a Great Private Bank, Brown Brothers Harriman & Co., 1818–1968 (1968) online
 Rappleye, Charles. Sons of Providence: The Brown brothers, the slave trade, and the American revolution (Simon and Schuster, 2007). excerpt

External links

History of Philadelphia
American companies established in 1818
Banks established in 1818
Former investment banks of the United States
1818 establishments in Pennsylvania
1931 disestablishments in Pennsylvania
American companies disestablished in 1931
1931 mergers and acquisitions